William Henry Clark (16 November 1929 – 3 June 2010) was a New Zealand rugby union player. A flanker, Clark represented Wellington at a provincial level, and was a member of the New Zealand national side, the All Blacks, from 1953 to 1956. He played 24 matches for the All Blacks including nine internationals.

Clark attended Nelson College from 1943 to 1948.  He died in Nelson on 3 June 2010, aged 80.

References

1929 births
2010 deaths
New Zealand international rugby union players
New Zealand rugby union players
People educated at Nelson College
Rugby union flankers
Rugby union players from Motueka